Hsu Yu-hsiou and Wu Yibing were the defending champions, but both players were no longer eligible to participate in junior tournaments.

Adrian Andreev and Anton Matusevich won the title, defeating Emilio Nava and Axel Nefve in the final, 6–4, 2–6, [10–8].

Seeds

Draw

Finals

Top half

Bottom half

External links 
 Main draw

Boys' Doubles
US Open, 2018 Boys' Doubles